Mölders is a German name. It may refer to:

 Carmen Nicole Moelders or Nicole Mölders, American atmospheric scientist
 Sascha Mölders (born 1985), German footballer, played for 1860 München
 Werner Mölders (1913–1941), German flying ace
 Jagdgeschwader 51, called “JG 51 Mölders” from 1942 on, was a Luftwaffe fighter wing during World War II
 Jagdgeschwader 74, called “JG 74 Mölders” between 1973 and 2005, is an aviation unit of the German Luftwaffe, based on Neuburg air base in Bavaria
 German destroyer Mölders (D186), a guided missile destroyer of the German Navy, in service 1969–2003
 Mölders (Emma), a fictional family in the historical romance manga “Emma” by Kaoru Mori

See also
 Mölder, a surname
 Molder (disambiguation)